Equilibrative nucleoside transporter 2 (ENT2) is a protein that in humans is encoded by the SLC29A2 gene.

See also 
 Solute carrier family
 Equilibrative nucleoside transporters
 Nucleoside transporters

References

Further reading 

Solute carrier family
Neurotransmitter transporters